Apenisa Tuta Vodo (born 28 July 1970) is a Fijian rugby union player and former Italian international.

Early life

Vodo was born in Suva, Fiji.

Career
He debuted in 1998 for Rugby Rovato

Vodo was one of the first Fijians to represent Italy internationally, the other being Manoa Vosawai.
He was part of then Coach, John Kirwan's 34-man squad to play Argentina and Australia in November 2002. He played for Calvisano.

References

1970 births
Italian rugby union players
Living people
Rugby union wings
Rugby union centres
Fijian expatriate sportspeople in Italy
Italy international rugby union players
Fijian expatriate rugby union players
Expatriate rugby union players in Italy
I-Taukei Fijian people